John Manuel Floyd (born September 10, 1956) is an American former professional football player who was a wide receiver in the National Football League (NFL) for the San Diego Chargers and the St. Louis Cardinals. He played college football for the Louisiana–Monroe Warhawks. As an NFL rookie with San Diego in 1979, Floyd was the Chargers' third receiver, backing up starters John Jefferson and Charlie Joiner.

References

1956 births
Living people
American football wide receivers
San Diego Chargers
St. Louis Cardinals (football) players
Louisiana–Monroe Warhawks football players